Bloodshot / Waste is the debut musical release by American singer Dove Cameron released on September 27, 2019, through Disruptor and Columbia. The EP consists of two songs, "Bloodshot" and "Waste", which both act as lead singles.

Track listing

References

2019 debut EPs